Ioannis "John" Limniatis (Greek: Ιωάννης "Τζον" Λημνιάτης; born 24 June 1967) is a retired professional soccer player who played as a midfielder. He captained and later became the head coach of the Montreal Impact. Born in Greece, he made 44 appearances scoring one goal for the Canada national team.

Club career
Before migrating to Canada with his family, Limniatis in 1977, used to train with the players of Greek Third Division side Ilisiakos in the 1970s, taking shots at legendary Greek goalkeeper Nikos Sarganis.

After beginning his pro career in 1987 with the Ottawa Pioneers of the Canadian Soccer League, he became the first ever Canadian to be sold to a European first division team. He was transferred for a fee of $50.000. Limniatis played professionally in Greece with First Division side Aris Thessaloniki from 1988 to 1992 and Panetolikos in the Second Division from 1992 to 1993. He then joined the Montreal Impact in the summer of 1993 and remained with the club until 1998. After a brief spell in the United States on loan with Charleston Battery, Limniatis returned to the Impact playing 24 more games in the 2000–01 season. Liminatis played both outdoors in the A-League and indoors in the National Professional Soccer League both with the Impact and the Kansas City Attack in 1995–96.

Limniatis was named 1994 A-League Rookie of the Year and 1996 and '97 Defender of the Year.

He's a member of both the Canadian & the Quebec Soccer Hall of Fame, inducted in 2009.

He is also the 1st and only soccer person so far to be inducted in the Quebec Sports Hall of Fame (Pantheon des sports du Quebec), inducted in 2012.

International career
Limniatis made his debut for Canada in a September 1987 friendly match against El Salvador, He earned a total of 44 caps, scoring 1 goal. He has represented Canada in 8 FIFA World Cup qualification matches in three unsuccessful World Cup qualifying campaigns.

His final international game was a March 1997 World Cup qualification match against the United States.

Managerial career
Limniatis spent his last years with the Impact as their assistant coach, indoor head coach, and later director of operations. He was coach for the Montreal Impact until Marc Dos Santos was named as interim head coach following Limniatis' termination by the Impact board.

Personal life

Limniatis's hometown is Laval, Quebec, Limniatis has two daughters, Alexia and Nikki. His cousin, Giorgos Limniatis,  is a former professional basketball player who played in Greece.

Career statistics
Scores and results list Canada's goal tally first.

References

External links
 / Canada Soccer Hall of Fame
 
 
 

1967 births
Living people
Footballers from Athens
Greek footballers
Sportspeople from Laval, Quebec
Greek emigrants to Canada
Naturalized citizens of Canada
Soccer people from Quebec
Association football defenders
Association football midfielders
Association football utility players
Canadian soccer coaches
Canadian soccer players
Canada men's international soccer players
Canadian expatriate soccer players
Canadian expatriate sportspeople in the United States
Greek expatriate footballers
Greek expatriate sportspeople in the United States
Ottawa Intrepid players
Aris Thessaloniki F.C. players
Panetolikos F.C. players
Montreal Impact (1992–2011) coaches
Montreal Impact (1992–2011) players
Charleston Battery players
Kansas City Attack (NPSL) players
Canadian Soccer League (1987–1992) players
American Professional Soccer League players
National Professional Soccer League (1984–2001) players
USISL players
A-League (1995–2004) players
Expatriate soccer players in the United States
1991 CONCACAF Gold Cup players
1993 CONCACAF Gold Cup players
1996 CONCACAF Gold Cup players